Anne-Laurence Petel (born 8 February 1970) is a French politician of La République En Marche! (LREM) who has been serving as a member of the National Assembly since the 2017 elections, representing the 14th district of Bouches-du-Rhône, which includes Aix-en-Provence.

Political career
In parliament, Petel serves on the Committee on Economic Affairs. In addition to her committee assignments, she is part of the French-Armenian Parliamentary Friendship Group and the French-Ethiopian Parliamentary Friendship Group.

Since November 2017, Petel has been part of LREM's executive board under the leadership of the party's successive chairmen Christophe Castaner and Stanislas Guerini.

References

Living people
People from Aix-en-Provence
Deputies of the 15th National Assembly of the French Fifth Republic
Women members of the National Assembly (France)
La République En Marche! politicians
21st-century French women politicians
1970 births
Members of Parliament for Bouches-du-Rhône
Deputies of the 16th National Assembly of the French Fifth Republic